The  Twenty Years' Anarchy is a historiographic term used by some modern scholars for the period of acute internal instability in the Byzantine Empire marked by the rapid succession of several emperors to the throne between the first deposition of Justinian II in 695 and the ascent of Leo III the Isaurian to the throne in 717, marking the beginning of the Isaurian dynasty.

Justinian II and the usurpers, 685–711 

Justinian II (685–711) set in motion a chain of events by embarking on a despotic and increasingly violent course. His policies met with considerable opposition, eventually provoking a rebellion led by Leontius (695–698) in 695, which deposed and exiled him, precipitating a prolonged period of instability and anarchy, with seven emperors in twenty-two years.

Leontius was popular at first, though the loss of Carthage soon ruined his reputation. John the Patrician led a navy to Carthage, losing in 698. The army feared Leontius, in the same year he was overthrown by Tiberius III (698–705). Tiberius managed to bolster the eastern frontier and reinforced the defenses of Constantinople, but meanwhile Justinian was conspiring to make a comeback and after forming an alliance with the Bulgars succeeded in taking Constantinople and executing Tiberius.

Justinian then continued to reign for a further six years (705–711). His treatment of Tiberius and his supporters had been brutal and he continued to rule in a manner that was despotic and cruel. He lost the ground regained by Tiberius in the east, and imposed his views on the Pope. However, before long he faced a rebellion led by Philippicus Bardanes (711–713). Justinian was captured and executed as was his son and co-emperor, Tiberius (706–711), thus extinguishing the Heraclian line. Justinian had taken the Byzantine empire yet further from its origins. He effectively abolished the historical role of Consul, merging it with Emperor, thus strengthening the Emperors' constitutional position as absolute monarch.

Philippicus Bardanes, 711–713 

Philippicus' rebellion extended beyond politics to religion, deposing the Patriarch Cyrus, reestablishing Monothelitism and overturning the Sixth Ecumenical Council, which in turn alienated the empire from Rome. Militarily the Bulgars reached the walls of Constantinople, and moving troops to defend the capital allowed the Arabs to make incursions in the east. His reign ended abruptly when an army rebellion deposed him and replaced him with Anastasius II (713–715).

Anastasius II, 713–715 

Anastasius reversed his predecessor's religious policies and responded to Arab attacks by sea and land, this time reaching as far as Galatia in 714, with some success. However the very army that had placed him on the throne (the Opsikion army) rose against him, proclaimed a new emperor and besieged Constantinople for six months, eventually forcing Anastasius to flee.

Theodosius III, 715–717 

The troops had proclaimed Theodosius III (715–717) as the new emperor, and once he had overcome Anastasius was almost immediately faced with the Arab preparations for the siege of Constantinople (717–718), forcing him to seek assistance from the Bulgars. He in turn faced rebellion from two other themata, Anatolikon and Armeniakon in 717, and chose to resign, being succeeded by Leo III (717–741) bringing an end to the cycle of violence and instability.

It is surprising that the Byzantine Empire was able to survive, given its internal problems, the speed with which the Sasanian Empire collapsed under the Arab threat, and the fact that it was being threatened simultaneously on two fronts. However, the strength of the military organization within the empire, and factional struggles within the Arab world, enabled it to do so.

See also 
 Arab-Byzantine wars
 Byzantine–Bulgarian Wars#Tervel's wars
 Family tree of Byzantine emperors

References

Sources 

 
 Jenkins, Romilly (1966). Byzantium The Imperial centuries AD 610-1071. Weidenfeld & Nicolson 

 
States and territories established in the 690s
States and territories disestablished in the 8th century
690s in the Byzantine Empire
700s in the Byzantine Empire
710s in the Byzantine Empire
Wars of succession involving the states and peoples of Europe
Wars of succession involving the states and peoples of Asia